A ribbon microphone, also known as a ribbon velocity microphone, is a type of microphone that uses a thin aluminum, duraluminum or nanofilm of electrically conductive ribbon placed between the poles of a magnet to produce a voltage by electromagnetic induction.  Ribbon microphones are typically bidirectional, meaning that they pick up sounds equally well from either side of the microphone.

Principle of operation 

In a moving-coil microphone, the diaphragm is attached to a light movable coil that generates a voltage as it moves back and forth between the poles of a permanent magnet. In ribbon microphones, a light metal ribbon (usually corrugated) is suspended between the poles of a magnet. As the ribbon vibrates, a voltage is induced at right angles to both the ribbon velocity and magnetic field direction and is picked off by contacts at the ends of the ribbon.  Ribbon microphones are also called "velocity microphones" because the induced voltage is proportional to the velocity of the ribbon and thus of the air particles in the sound wave, unlike in some other microphones where the voltage is proportional to the displacement of the diaphragm and the air.

One important advantage that the ribbon microphone had when it was introduced is that its very lightweight ribbon, which is under very little tension, has a resonant frequency lower than 20 Hz; in contrast to the typical resonant frequency of the diaphragms in contemporary high quality microphones which used other technology.  The typical resonant frequency of those microphones is within the range of human hearing.  So even the very early commercially available ribbon microphones had excellent frequency response throughout the nominal range of human hearing (20 Hz to 20 kHz for a young adult).

The voltage output of older ribbon microphones is typically quite low compared to a dynamic moving coil microphone, and a step-up transformer is used to increase the voltage output and increase the output impedance. Modern ribbon microphones do not suffer from this problem due to improved magnets and more efficient transformers and have output levels that can exceed typical stage dynamic microphones.

Ribbon microphones were once delicate and expensive, but modern materials make certain present-day ribbon microphones very durable, and so they may be used for loud rock music and stage work. They are prized for their ability to capture high-frequency detail, comparing very favorably with condenser microphones, which can often sound subjectively "aggressive" or "brittle" in the high end of the frequency spectrum. Due to their bidirectional pick-up pattern, ribbon microphones may be used in pairs to produce the Blumlein Pair recording array.  In addition to the standard bidirectional pick-up pattern, ribbon microphones can also be configured to have cardioid, hypercardioid, and variable pattern.

As many mixers are equipped with phantom power in order to enable the use of condenser microphones, care should be taken when using condenser and ribbon microphones at the same time. If the ribbon microphone is improperly wired, which is not unheard of with older microphones, this capability can damage some ribbon elements; however, improvements in designs and materials have made those concerns largely inconsequential in modern ribbon microphones.

History

In the early 1920s, Drs. Walter H. Schottky and Erwin Gerlach co-invented the first ribbon microphone. By turning the ribbon circuit in the opposite direction, they also invented the first ribbon loudspeaker. A few years later, Dr. Harry F. Olson of RCA started developing ribbon microphones using field coils and permanent magnets. The RCA Photophone Type PB-31 was commercially manufactured in 1931, greatly impacting the audio recording and broadcasting industries. Condenser microphones at the time could not compare to its frequency response. Radio City Music Hall employed PB-31s in 1932. The following year, the 44A came on the scene. Its tone and pattern control helped reduce reverberation. Many RCA ribbon models are still in use and valued by audio engineers.

The BBC-Marconi Type A was an iconic ribbon microphone produced by the BBC and Marconi between 1934 and 1959. Also of note is the ST&C Coles 4038 (or PGS – pressure gradient single), designed by the BBC in 1954 and still used for some applications to this day. Its historical uses varied from talks to symphony concerts, and it is regarded as a delicate, fine traditional microphone. The German Beyerdynamic M 160 was introduced in 1957, fitted with a smaller microphone element with two 15 mm ribbons combined to create a highly directional pickup pattern. The microphone proved to be popular in recording studios.

Around 2002, relatively inexpensive ($80 – $200) ribbon microphones manufactured in China and inspired by the RCA-44 and older Soviet Oktava ribbon microphones became available.  UK based Stewart Taverner and his company XAudia developed "The Beeb", modifying vintage Reslo ribbon microphones for better tone, performance and increased output.
  
In 2007, microphones employing ribbon elements made of strong nanomaterials became available, offering orders of magnitude improvement in signal purity and output level.

The ribbon microphone is an electrically simple design with no active circuitry; it is possible to build one from a kit, or with basic tools and materials. The acoustic complexity of ribbon microphones is comparable to other types of air coupled transducers.

See also 
 Audio recording

References 

 Ribbon microphones

de:Mikrofon#Bändchenmikrofon